The East Los Angeles Walkouts or Chicano Blowouts were a series of 1968 protests by Chicano students against unequal conditions in Los Angeles Unified School District high schools. The first walkout occurred on March 5, 1968. The students who organized and carried out the protests were primarily concerned with the quality of their education. This movement, which involved thousands of students in the Los Angeles area, was identified as "the first major mass protest against racism undertaken by Mexican-Americans in the history of the United States."

The day before the walkouts began, FBI director J. Edgar Hoover sent out a memo to local law enforcement to place top priority on "political intelligence work to prevent the development of nationalist movements in minority communities." For his part in organizing the walkouts, Harry Gamboa Jr. was named "one of the hundred most dangerous and violent subversives in the United States" by the U.S. Senate Committee on the Judiciary, shared by activists such as Angela Davis, Eldridge Cleaver, and Reies Tijerina, and his activities were deemed "anti-establishment, anti-white, and militant."

Since the school walkouts, Los Angeles schools have since increased in Mexican American school teachers and administrators, they've also seen higher graduation and college attendant rates as well as incorporating both Latino and Bilingual studies and programs. Even though all of the demands of the protesters still have not been met, they've since then opened pathways for future education activists for many years to come.

Background
During the 1950s and 1960s, Chicanos took part in the national quest for civil rights, fighting court battles and building social and political movements. Chicano youth in particular became politicized, having taken advantage of many opportunities their parents never had. This became known as the Chicano movement, similar to the civil rights movement but for Chicano individuals battling for equality and power.

In a radio interview, Moctesuma Esparza, one of the original walkout organizers, talked about his experiences as a high school student fighting for Chicano rights.  Esparza first became involved in activism in 1965 after attending a youth leadership conference. He helped organize a group of Chicano teenagers, Young Citizens for Community Action.  This group eventually evolved into Young Chicanos For Community Action, then later as the Brown Berets, still fighting for Chicano equality in California. Esparza graduated 12th grade in 1967, and enrolled at UCLA., where he and fellow Chicano students continued organizing protests.  At the same time, he and 11 friends started a group called UMAS, whose goal was to increase Chicano enrollment in colleges. Soon, UMAS shifted its strategy by splitting up into smaller groups, with each group to mentor students at the L.A. high schools with both high minority enrollment and high drop-out rates. Garfield, Roosevelt, Lincoln, Belmont, and Wilson high schools (all of which were involved in the walkouts) had among the highest dropout rates in the city. Garfield had the highest rate in the city at 58%, with Roosevelt in second at 45%.

The same conditions that led to these astronomical drop-out rates were the chief motive of the walkouts. Both faculty and administration were short staffed, leading to 40-student classes and a school counselor with 4,000 students. Classroom materials, especially in history classes, painted over Chicano history. The majority of teachers held their own students in belittling contempt. This attitude was reflected in a letter written by a teacher at Lincoln High School, Richard Davis:

Most of the Chicanos have never had it so good. Before the Spanish came, he was an Indian grubbing in the soil, and after the Spaniards came he was a slave. It seems to me that America must be a very desirable place, witness the number of "wetbacks" and migrants both legal and illegal from Mexico.

To improve these conditions, the students decided to organize. Esparza, Larry Villalvazo and a few other UMAS members, along with teacher Sal Castro, helped organize hundreds of students to walk out of classes in 1968 protests to highlight the conditions that they faced. As the protests grew, they gained the attention of the school board, which agreed to meet with students and listen to their demands.

Another leading female role in the walkouts was Victoria "Vickie" Castro.
Vickie Castro was born in East Los Angeles and attended a high school in East Los Angeles in the early 1960s and knew what the students of the late 60s were going through. She attended UCLA and was going for education administration. In college she was approached by Sal Castro to attend a youth conference to bring young, educated Chicanos together and bring awareness of their fight and struggles. David Sanchez and Vickie Castro were the founding members of the Brown Berets and also held meetings at their coffee shop called La Piranya. It was a small bohemian coffee shop which was famous for its hippie-style shops around that time. The Brown Berets were also in attendance and recruited some of the students. According to Sal Castro, "I knew both Vickie and David because both had attended one of the Camp Hess Kramer conferences and were impressive young people. As a result of their experiences at the conference, they became more political." At these conferences is where she found her voice, she states, “This is where I got my voice. This is where my passion for justice was born in me. It changed my whole being.”

Walkouts ("Blowouts") 

On March 1, 1968, the first students to walk out were from Wilson High School, which had among the highest dropout rates of any LA-area high school. Though organizers had been planning for some time to stage walk outs to demonstrate against unsatisfactory conditions, the first blowout at Wilson was unplanned, precipitated by the principal cancelling a student-produced play that was deemed too risqué for the students to perform. 
 Between 200-300 students participated.  On March 5, about 2,000 students at Garfield initiated the first planned walkout, prompting school authorities to call in police.  Eventually, an estimated 15 to 20,000 students walked away from seven high school campuses in East Los Angeles (Wilson, Garfield, Roosevelt, Lincoln — 75% of students attending those schools were Chicano) and other parts of Los Angeles (Belmont, Jefferson, Venice).
  
Funds for Los Angeles public schools were allocated based on the number of students in class each day. By having students walk out of homeroom before attendance was taken, the organizers could increase public attention by targeting the schools financially.

Among supporters for the walkouts Vickie Castro, a leading female political activist and former Roosevelt High School Student had a leading role in the blowouts' success. Castro's work started upon her graduation from Cal State as she realized the lack of Chicano students who make it to higher education. She then became motivated with her found sense of political activism. With her found purpose she helped form the Chicano organization today known as the Brown Berets. The Brown Berets are a militant Chicano rights group which first formed as the young Chicanos for community actions but later became the Brown Berets. The group worked giving support for the Chicano movement for issues such as; educational reform, farm worker rights, police brutality, and the Vietnam war. In March 1968, after school districts in the East Los Angeles area were noted as being “run down campuses, with lack of college prep courses, and teachers who were poorly trained, indifferent, or racist." Castro was a leading force in  organizing the blowouts as she aided these children in their cause, giving them the courage to help them stand up for themselves which gave the students a new increased sense of Chicano pride. On March 6, 1968, Castro entered Lincoln High School pretending to be applying for a teaching position. She quickly bombarded the school principal with questions to distract him while organizers entered the school. As other organizers entered their job was to convince students to leave the campus. Then she proceeded to enter Roosevelt High School, where she had previously attended high school, where she planned on carrying out the same plans. She was unable to though due to a teacher recognizing her threatening to call the police if she did not leave the premises. As her attempt in Roosevelt High School failed lastly, she offered her car to pull down a chain linked fence which was set up to keep organizers to enter the school. Castro's role among others was to influence the youth to stand up for the inequality in the schools.

The blowouts served as a catalyst to the Chicano Movement and provided these young men and women an increased sense of pride.

Student demands 
Following the walkouts, students were able to meet with the board of education. At this meeting, student leaders presented a list of demands that addressed what they felt were the most pressing issues within their schools that affected their education.

Academic demands
 "No student or teacher will be reprimanded or suspended for participating in any efforts which are executed for the purpose of improving or furthering the educational quality in our schools.
 Bilingual-Bi-cultural education will be compulsory for Chicanos in the Los Angeles Unified School District where there is a majority of Chicano students. This program will be open to all other students on a voluntary basis. 
A) in-service education programs will be instituted immediately for all staff in order to teach them the Spanish language and increase their understanding of the history, traditions, and contributions of the Mexican culture. 
B) All administrators in the elementary and secondary schools in these areas will become proficient in the Spanish language Participants are to be compensated during the training period at not less than $8.80 an hour and upon completion of the course will receive in addition to their salary not less than $100.00 a month. The monies for these programs will come from local funds, state funds and matching federal funds.
 Administrators and teachers who show any form of prejudice toward Mexican or Chicano students, including failure to recognize, understand, and appreciate Mexican culture and heritage, will be removed from East Los Angeles schools. This will be decided by a Citizens Review Board selected by the Educational Issues Committee.
 Textbooks and curriculum will be developed to show Mexican and Chicano contribution to the U.S. society and to show the injustices that Mexicans have suffered as a culture of that society. Textbooks should concentrate on Mexican folklore rather than English folklore.
 All administrators where schools have majority of Chicano descent shall be of Chicano descent. If necessary, training programs should be instituted to provide a cadre of Chicano administrators.
 Every teacher's ratio of failure per students in his classroom shall be made available to community groups and students. Any teacher having a particularly high percentage of the total school dropouts in his classes shall be rated by the Citizens Review Board composed of the Educational Issues Committee.

Administrative demands
 Schools should have a manager to take care of paper work and maintenance supervision. Administrators will direct the Education standards of the School instead of being head janitors and office clerks as they are today.
 School facilities should be made available for community activities under the supervision of Parents' Councils (not PTA). Recreation programs for children will be developed.
 No teacher will be dismissed or transferred because of his political views and/or philosophical disagreements with administrators.
 Community parents will be engaged as teacher's aides. Orientation similar to in-service training, will be provided, and they will be given status as semi-professionals as in the new careers concept.

Facilities demands
 The Industrial Arts program must be re-vitalized. Students need proper training to use the machinery of modern-day industry. Up-to-date equipment and new operational techniques must replace the obsolescent machines and outmoded training methods currently being employed in this program. If this high standard cannot be met, the Industrial Arts program will be de-emphasized.
 New high schools in the area must be immediately built. The new schools will be named by the community. At least two Senior High Schools and at least one Junior High School must be built. Marengo Street School must be reactivated to reduce the student-teacher load at Murchison Street School.
 Library facilities will be expanded in all East Los Angeles high schools. At present the libraries in these high schools do not meet the educational needs of the students. Sufficient library materials will be provided in Spanish."
 All bathrooms to remain unlocked at all times.

Timeline
March 1, 1968: Over 15,000 Chicanos, students, faculty, and community members, walk out of seven East L.A. high schools. Those schools included:  Garfield, Roosevelt, Lincoln, Belmont, Wilson, Venice, and Jefferson High School. Some students from East L.A. junior high schools join the protests, as well.

March 11, 1968: The Chicano community (students, faculty, parents, and activists) began to organize and create the Educational Issues Coordinating Committee (EICC). They intended to demonstrate the needs and concerns of those who participated in the walkouts at the Los Angeles County Board of Education meeting, the Board later agreed.

March 28, 1968: The meeting between the Los Angeles Board of Education and the Educational Issues Coordinating Committee takes place. Over 1,200 community members attend the meeting, and the EICC got to present their 39 demands from the Board. The Board denied the demands and the students walked out of the meeting.

March 31, 1968: Thirteen of the Chicano walkout organizers were arrested, also known as the Eastside 13 for conspiracy to start the walkouts. Among those arrested were high school students, college students, organizers from the Brown Berets, editors of La Raza newspaper, and other organizers from the United Chicano Students organization. Students and community members immediately organized a protest around the Hall of Justice in Downtown LA to ask for the release of the LA 13. Only 12 of the 13 were released. Sal Castro, a teacher and key organizer of the walkouts, held the most charges and was held in detention the longest.

June 2, 1968: Sal Castro was released on bail, but lost his teaching position at Lincoln High school due to the arrest. 2,000 people protested outside of the police station to demand he get his teaching position back.

September–October 1968: Students and community members organized round-the-clock sit-ins at the LA Board office until Sal Castro could be reinstated for his teaching position. The board eventually allowed Castro to resume his position.

Aftermath
Many of the student organizers became prominent in their fields. Moctesuma Esparza, one of the thirteen charged with disrupting the schools, who became known as the East L.A. 13, later became a successful film producer. He helped recruit more Chicanos to Hollywood. Harry Gamboa Jr. became an artist and writer. Carlos Montes, a Brown Berets minister, was charged with arson at a hotel during the Chicano Moratorium protest against the Vietnam War; after fleeing the country he eventually faced trial and was acquitted. Paula Crisostomo became a school administrator, where she continues to fight for reform. Vickie Castro was elected to the Los Angeles Los Angeles Unified School District Board of Education. Carlos Muñoz, Jr., went on to a distinguished teaching and research career at the University of California, Berkeley. Carlos R. Moreno - who participated in the Camp Hess Kramer conference—went on to study law and eventually became a judge for the Supreme Court of California.

The student actions of 1968 inspired later protests that used similar tactics, including the 1994 student walkouts against California Proposition 187, the 2006 student walkouts against H.R. 4437, the 2009 walkouts against Arizona's SB1070, and 2007 walkouts in support of the proposed Cesar Chavez holiday. Additionally, many films, documentaries, biographies, and more have been produced as result of the Walkouts; some of the projects contain a direct recounting of the Blowouts while others simply tell similar, loosely based stories. Some of these media projects include Stand and Deliver, Freedom Writers, Precious Knowledge, Racism on Trial by Ian F. Haney López, and more.

See also

 Stand and Deliver (film)
 Freedom Writers (film) 
 Precious Knowledge (documentary) 
 Racism on Trial (book) 
 Love & Walkouts (podcast)
 Latino Parents and Education (podcast)
 Marching Students (book)
Walkout (film)

Further reading

References

Sources

External links
Movie About East LA Walkouts and Brown Berets Begins Filming

 DEMOCRACY NOW: Walkout: The True Story of the Historic 1968 Chicano Student Walkout in East L.A.

Civil rights protests in the United States
Los Angeles Unified School District
1968 in California
Boycotts of organizations
Conflicts in 1968
Eastside Los Angeles
Mexican-American culture in Los Angeles
History of Los Angeles
March 1968 events in the United States